Jennifer Nairn-Smith is an Australian-born dancer, actress and choreographer.She was a member of the New York city Ballet from 1963 to 1968, at Lincoln Center, NYC. She trained at  choreographer's School of American Ballet before being accepted into the NYCB.  Her teachers there were Madame Felia Dubrovska, Muriel Stewart, Madame Danilova, Pierre Vladimirov, Stanley Williams.  George Ballanchine.

Career

Stage
Nairn-Smith appeared in the original Broadway productions of Follies and Pippin.

Film and television
Her film and TV appearances include the Bob Fosse autobiographical musical All That Jazz (1979), The Best Little Whorehouse in Texas (1982) and Return to Eden (1983).

References

External links
 
 
 Jennifer Nairn-Smith Performs “With You” From Pippin, 1973

Australian female dancers
Australian film actresses
Living people
Year of birth missing (living people)
Place of birth missing (living people)
Australian musical theatre actresses